Dagrun Eriksen (born 28 June 1971 in Kristiansand) is a Norwegian politician for the Christian People's Party (KrF). She served as deputy leader of the party from 2004 to 2017.

Political career 

Eriksen was elected into the Norwegian parliament (Storting) from the county of Vest-Agder in 2001. She was not re-elected in the 2005 elections, but took Jon Lilletun's seat upon his illness and later death. In 2009 she had the top spot on the party's ballot in Vest-Agder and

In 2012 Eriksen lost a fight for the top spot on the party's list for the 2013 Norwegian parliamentary election to Hans Fredrik Grøvan and will not be on the ballot at all. Possible explanations for her loss according to pundits might have been that she was perceived to have focused too much on national politics and too little on the county's particular issues and that she was perceived as too liberal on some issues.

Parliamentary Presidium duties 
2005 – 2009 vice secretary of Lagstinget.

Parliamentary Committee duties 
2001 – present,  member of Standing Committee on Education, Research and Church Affairs, second deputy chair since 2006, first deputy chair since 2009
2001 – 2005 member of the Family, Culture and Administration committee.
1997 – 2001 member of the Defense committee until 17 March 2000.

References

External links 
 

1971 births
Living people
Norwegian Christians
Christian Democratic Party (Norway) politicians
Vest-Agder politicians
Politicians from Kristiansand
Members of the Storting
Women members of the Storting
21st-century Norwegian politicians
21st-century Norwegian women politicians
20th-century Norwegian politicians
20th-century Norwegian women politicians